Bernard IV, Margrave of Baden-Durlach (born 1517 – died 20 January 1553) was Margrave of Baden-Pforzheim from 26 September 1552 until his death.

Life 
Bernhard was the second son from the first marriage of Margrave Ernest of Baden-Profzheim with Elisabeth of Brandenburg-Ansbach-Kulmbach.

Like his older brother Albert, Bernard has been attributed a dissolute life, and been described as a wild creature. His bad reputation halted negotiations between his father and the Duke of Cleves, brother of the fourth wife of King Henry VIII of England, Anne of Cleves, for him to marry the Duke's other sister Amelia. In 1537, he opposed the proposed division of his father's territory among his father's sons, and in particular against the rights of his half-brother Charles II, arguing that his father's second marriage had been morganatic. After his brother Albert died in 1542, his father forgave him his earlier opposition and promised him he would inherit Lower Baden.

In 1540 he acquired the citizenship of the city Basel. He also owed a debt to the city.

He ruled Lower Baden, with the cities of Pforzheim and Durlach from 26 September 1552 until his death, while his half-brother Charles II ruled Upper Baden. However, his rule lasted only a few months, as he died unexpectedly on 20 January 1553. He was buried in the Collegiate Church in Pforzheim.

See also 
 List of rulers of Baden

References 
 Johann Christian Sachs: Einleitung in die Geschichte der Marggravschaft und des marggrävlichen altfürstlichen Hauses Baden, Karlsruhe, 1764–1770, vol. 4, pp. 73–75

Footnotes 

Margraves of Baden
People from Basel-Stadt
1517 births
1553 deaths
16th-century German people